The Women's 10 metre air rifle standing SH1 event at the 2008 Summer Paralympics took place on September 7 at the Beijing Shooting Range Hall. It was the first medal awarded at the 2008 Paralympics Games.

Qualification round

Q Qualified for final

Final

Shooting at the 2008 Summer Paralympics
Para